Scott Howard Medvin (born September 16, 1961) is a former professional baseball pitcher. He played parts of three seasons in Major League Baseball for the Pittsburgh Pirates (1988–89) and Seattle Mariners (1990). Medvin was a 1979 graduate of North Olmsted High School.

References

External links

Mexican League
The Baseball Gauge
Venezuela Winter League

1961 births
Living people
American expatriate baseball players in Canada
American expatriate baseball players in Mexico
Baldwin Wallace University alumni
Baldwin Wallace Yellow Jackets baseball players
Baseball players from Ohio
Birmingham Barons players
Buffalo Bisons (minor league) players
Calgary Cannons players
Industriales de Monterrey players
Lakeland Tigers players
Leones del Caracas players
American expatriate baseball players in Venezuela
Major League Baseball pitchers
Mexican League baseball pitchers
People from North Olmsted, Ohio
Pittsburgh Pirates players
Phoenix Firebirds players
Rieleros de Aguascalientes players
Saraperos de Saltillo players
Seattle Mariners players
Shreveport Captains players
Vancouver Canadians players
Wausau Timbers players